John M. Ely, Jr. (February 17, 1919 – March 30, 2007) was an American Democratic politician, purchasing agent, and civil rights activist who served two terms in the Iowa House of Representatives and Iowa State Senate from 1961 to 1969. Ely was instrumental in abolishing capital punishment in Iowa.

Early years and education
Ely was born to John Montague Ely, Sr. and Laurel Sullivan Ely. He graduated from Franklin High School and was educated at Coe College, the University of Iowa, and Princeton University where he received his degree in 1941. Ely served as a purser in the United States Merchant Marine from 1942 to 1945.

Marriage and family
Ely married Polly (Shirley Ward) Ely on June 20, 1942. They had three children, John Montague Ely III (Connie), Martha Ely Goralka (Joseph), and Nathaniel Ward Ely, five grandchildren and 13 great grand children.

Opposition to capital punishment
Ely was strongly opposed to capital punishment, a position reinforced after he voluntarily witnessed the execution of Victor Feguer on March 15, 1963, the most recent execution in Iowa, and the last federal execution in the United States until the execution of Timothy McVeigh on June 11, 2001. Ely recounted his memories of the execution saying "The rope snapped, and as he hung in the air, suddenly, he took a deep breath. I dug my elbow into the Associated Press man next to me and said, 'Look, George, human life fighting to preserve itself.'"; in fact, the breathing was the involuntary reflex of the corpse.

Ely's push to abolish the state death penalty in Iowa was supported by Governor Harold Hughes, who also opposed the death penalty.

Legislative service
Ely served from January 9, 1961 to January 10, 1965 in the Iowa House of Representatives, representing the 48th District (Linn County), and as a member of the Iowa State Senate from January 11, 1965 to January 12, 1969, representing the 20th (Polk County) and 24th (Linn County) Districts respectively.

Ely's signature achievements were the successful repeal of Iowa's death penalty in 1965, his co-sponsorship of the Fair Housing Bill of Iowa, and his efforts towards establishing the Iowa Civil Rights Commission and passing the Iowa Civil Rights Act of 1965 and the Open Housing Law of 1967.

Later years and death
Ely continued to work for the Quaker Oats Company until he retired in 1984. Among Ely's activities later in life was his work as a "citizen-lobbyist", pressing Congress for micro-enterprise, free primary education in developing countries, and the Global Health Fund which sought to combat HIV/AIDS. Ely was also a mentor to countless young people in the Cedar Rapids area, many of whom went on to be community leaders and activists. He died from complications of surgery in St. Luke's Hospital in Cedar Rapids, Iowa, on Friday, March 30, 2007.  His cremated remains were inurned in Oak Hill Cemetery.

Later in 2007, John Ely's wife, Polly Ely, accepted the Iowans Against The Death Penalty Gov. Harold E. Hughes Award on his behalf. Polly Ely died on May 15, 2008, also aged 88. Ely was remembered in 2009 in a joint memorial service for twenty-five deceased Iowa lawmakers, held at the State Senate.

Affiliations
Ely served on the board of Planned Parenthood, the Visiting Nurses Association, and was President of the Oak Hill Cemetery Board. He was also active in the United Nations Association, the YMCA, and the Hawkeye chapter of the Iowa Civil Liberties Union, the Iowa affiliate of the American Civil Liberties Union. Ely was a member of the NAACP. He was a longtime member of the Peoples Church Unitarian-Universalist in Cedar Rapids.

References

                   

1919 births
2007 deaths
Politicians from Cedar Rapids, Iowa
Democratic Party members of the Iowa House of Representatives
Democratic Party Iowa state senators
American anti–death penalty activists
Princeton University alumni
American Unitarian Universalists
Coe College alumni
University of Iowa alumni
United States Merchant Mariners
PepsiCo people
Place of birth missing
20th-century American politicians
United States Merchant Mariners of World War II